McCrery is a surname. It is derived from the Irish and Scottish Gaelic surnames Mac Ruidhrí and Mac Ruaidhrí.

People with the surname
Jim McCrery (born 1949), American lawyer and politician
Nigel McCrery (born 1953), English screenwriter

Citations

References

Anglicised Irish-language surnames
Anglicised Scottish Gaelic-language surnames
Patronymic surnames